Charles L. Thompson and associates is an architectural group that was established in Arkansas since the late 1800s. It is now known as Cromwell Architects Engineers, Inc.. This article is about Thompson and associates' work as part of one architectural group, and its predecessor and descendant firms, including under names Charles L. Thompson, Thompson & Harding, Sanders & Ginocchio, and Thompson, Sanders and Ginocchio.

The firm was the "most prolific architectural firm" practicing in Arkansas in the late 1800s and early 1900s, and produced more than 2,000 buildings. The architectural group used standard and custom designs that both led and evolved with changing architectural taste in Arkansas. The group built a wide range of types of works, including large public buildings, commercial buildings, mansions, and small houses. Many works by Thompson and the associated firms survive and are listed on the National Register of Historic Places.

Charles L. Thompson
Charles Louis Thompson (16 November 1868 – December 30, 1959) was the original head of the firm.  Thompson was born in 1868 in Danville, Illinois.  Orphaned at age fourteen, he and siblings moved to Indiana, where Charles began work at a mill, and in off hours began to learn drafting. Thompson's son-in-law, Edwin Boykin Cromwell (1909–2001) later headed the firm.

Thematic Resources study
A total of 143 properties in thirty Arkansas counties were nominated for NRHP listing in the 1982 study, "Charles L. Thompson Design Collection Thematic Resources", written by multiple authors.  F. Hampton Roy, a Little Rock ophthalmologist, began cataloging the architectural drawings, expecting to complete a book. His collection eventually inspired this study, as Thompson and associates had such influence on Arkansas architecture. The properties listed under this study were selected from review of a large collection of original drawings by Charles L. Thompson, Fred J. H. Rickon, Thomas Harding Jr., Theo Sanders, and Frank Ginocchio. The collection of drawings covered 2500 properties representing a wide range of types and styles geographically distributed over the entire state of Arkansas.  The authors wrote: "The 143 structures selected for nomination exemplify the firm's remarkable versatility and productivity from 1896 through 1931," and "Charles L. Thompson was the constant motivating force behind the firm's immense productivity and influence upon the state's built environment. Today the firm he established continues this legacy."

Ginocchio and Sanders
Frank Ginocchio and Theodore M. Sanders, partners since 1919, joined Thompson in partnership in 1927.  Both had studied at the University of Illinois and Sanders had studied further at the Ecole des Beaux Arts in Paris.  They brought design ideas of Prairie Style, influenced by Frank Lloyd Wright, and Art Deco architecture to the firm.

Theo Sanders designed several houses in Little Rock's Hillcrest neighborhood.

Others
Architect John Parks Almand worked for the firm during 1912 to 1914 before forming his own practice.

Works
Works (with variations in attribution indicated) include:
Al-Amin Temple, Little Rock, Arkansas, Prairie style, added to the NRHP in 1982 and removed from NRHP in 1986,
Associate Reformed Presbyterian Church, 3323 W. 12th St., Little Rock, Arkansas (Thompson, Charles L.), built 1925, Classical Revival, NRHP-listed
Baer House, 1010 Rock St., Little Rock, Arkansas (Thompson, Charles L.), built 1915, Bungalow/Craftsman, NRHP-listed
Bank of Carthage, (1907), AR 229, Carthage, Arkansas (Thompson, Charles L.), built 1907, Classical Revival, NRHP-listed
Bethel House, Erwin and 2nd Sts., Des Arc, Arkansas (Thompson, Charles L.), built 1918, Bungalow/Craftsman, NRHP-listed
Beyerlein House, 412 W. 14th St., Little Rock, Arkansas (Thompson, Charles L.), built 1917, Bungalow/Craftsman, NRHP-listed
Bishop Hiram A. Boaz House, 22 Armistead Rd., Little Rock, AR (Thompson, Charles L.), built 1926, Tudor Revival, NRHP-listed
Boone County Courthouse, Courthouse Sq., Harrison, AR, (Thompson, Charles L.) NRHP-listed
Boone County Jail, Central Ave. and Willow St., Harrison, AR (Thompson, Charles L.) NRHP-listed
Boone House (Little Rock, Arkansas), 4014 Lookout, Little Rock, AR (Thompson & Harding) NRHP-listed
BPOE Elks Club (Little Rock, Arkansas), 4th and Scott Sts., Little Rock, AR (Saunders, Theo), Late 19th and 20th Century Revivals, 2nd Renaissance Revival, Theo Saunders was an architect in the firm, and this work was specifically included in the Thematic Resources listing,
Brown House, 1604 Caldwell St., Conway, AR (Thompson, Charles L.) NRHP-listed
Bush House, 1516 Ringo St., Little Rock, AR (Thompson & Harding) NRHP-listed
Caldwell Hall, University Drive, Pine Bluff, AR (Thompson, Sanford, & Ginnochio) NRHP-listed
Campbell-Chrisp House, 102 Elm St., Bald Knob, Arkansas (Thompson, Charles)
Ella Carnall Hall, Arkansas Ave. and Maple St., Fayetteville, AR (Thompson, Charles L.) NRHP-listed
Central Presbyterian Church, 1921 Arch St., Little Rock, AR (Thompson & Harding) NRHP-listed
Christ the King Church, Greenwood Ave. at S. S St., Ft. Smith, AR (Thompson, Sanders & Ginocchio), built 1930, Mission/Spanish Revival, NRHP-listed
Clark County Courthouse, 4th and Crittenden Sts., Arkadelphia, AR (Thompson, Charles),  built 1899 in Romanesque style, NRHP-listed
Clark County Library, 609 Caddo St., Arkadelphia, AR (Thompson, Charles L.) NRHP-listed
Clark House, 1324 S. Main St., Malvern, AR (Thompson, Charles L.) NRHP-listed
Coca-Cola Building, (1929), 211 N. Moose, Morrilton, AR (Thompson, Sanders & Ginocchio) built 1929, Colonial Revival and Modern Movement, NRHP-listed
Columbia County Jail, Calhoun & Jefferson Sts., Magnolia, AR (Thompson & Harding) NRHP-listed
Croxson House, 1901 Gaines St., Little Rock, AR (Thompson, Charles L.) NRHP-listed
Darragh House, 2412 Broadway, Little Rock, AR (Thompson, Charles L.) NRHP-listed
Davis House, 212 Fulton St., Clarksville, AR (Thompson, Charles L.) NRHP-listed
Dean House, (c.1910), off US 165, Portland, AR (Thompson, Charles) NRHP-listed
Deener House, 310 E. Center Ave., Searcy, AR (Thompson, Charles L.) NRHP-listed
Domestic Science Building, 11th and Haddock, Arkadelphia, AR (Thompson & Harding) NRHP-listed
Dortch Plantation, NE of Scott off AR 130 at Bearskin Lake, Scott, AR (Thompson, Charles L.) NRHP-listed
Dunaway House, 2022 Battery, Little Rock, AR (Thompson, Charles L.) NRHP-listed
Dunlap House, 101 Grandview, Clarksville, AR (Thompson, Charles L.) NRHP-listed
Eagle House, 217 Ash St., Lonoke, AR (Thompson, Charles) NRHP-listed
Joe P. Eagle and D. R. Boone Building, 105–107 W. Front St., Lonoke, AR (Thompson, Charles L.) NRHP-listed
England House, 2121 Arch St., Little Rock, AR (Thompson, Charles L.) NRHP-listed
Exchange Bank Building, 423 Main St., Little Rock, AR (Thompson & Harding) NRHP-listed
Farmers State Bank, 1001 Front St., Conway, AR (Thompson & Harding) NRHP-listed
Farrell House (2109 Louisiana), Little Rock, AR (Thompson, Charles L.) NRHP-listed
Farrell House (2111 Louisiana), Little Rock, AR (Thompson, Charles L.) NRHP-listed
Farrell House (2115 Louisiana), Little Rock, AR (Thompson, Charles L.) NRHP-listed, Bungalow/Craftsman style, built 1914
Farrell House (2121 Louisiana), Little Rock, AR (Thompson, Charles L.) NRHP-listed
Federal Reserve Bank Building, 123 W. Third St., Little Rock, AR, NRHP-listed
First National Bank of Morrilton, (c. 1925), Main at Moose St., Morrilton, AR (Thompson, Charles L.) NRHP-listed
First Presbyterian Church (Hot Springs), 213 Whittington, Hot Springs, AR (Thompson, Charles L.) NRHP-listed
First Presbyterian Church (Little Rock), 123 E. Eighth St., Little Rock, AR (Thompson, Charles) NRHP-listed
First Presbyterian Church (Newport, Arkansas), 4th and Main Sts. Newport, AR, (Sanders & Ginocchio), NRHP-listed
First United Methodist Church, Jct. of Jefferson and Cross Sts., DeWitt, AR (Thompson & Harding) NRHP-listed
Fletcher House, 909 Cumberland St., Little Rock, AR (Thompson, Charles L.) NRHP-listed
Florence Crittenton Home, 3600 W. 11th St., Little Rock, AR (Thompson & Harding) NRHP-listed
Fordyce Home Accident Ins. Co., (1908), 300 Main, Fordyce, AR (Thompson, Charles L.) NRHP-listed
Fordyce House (Hot Springs), 746 Park Ave., Hot Springs, AR (Thompson, Charles L.) NRHP-listed
Fordyce House (Little Rock), 2115 S. Broadway, Little Rock, AR (Thompson, Charles L.) NRHP-listed

Foster House, 303 N. Hervey St., Hope, AR (Thompson, Charles L.) NRHP-listed
Frauenthal House (Little Rock), 2008 Arch St., Little Rock, AR (Thompson & Harding) NRHP-listed
Fraunthal House, 631 Western, Conway, AR (Thompson, Charles L.) NRHP-listed
Frauenthal & Schwarz Building, 824 Front St. Conway, AR (Sanders & Ginocchio), NRHP-listed
French-England House, 1700 Broadway, Little Rock, AR (Thompson, Charles L.) NRHP-listed
Galloway Hall, Hendrix College campus, Conway, AR (Thompson, Charles) NRHP-listed
Gazzola and Vaccaro Building, 131-133 W. Cypress Brinkley, AR (Thompson, Charles L.) NRHP-listed
Gracie House, Off AR 88, New Gascony, AR (Thompson and Harding) NRHP-listed
Gregg House, 412 Pine St. Newport, AR (Sanders & Ginocchio), NRHP-listed
Hall House, 32 Edgehill, Little Rock, AR (Thompson, Sanders, & Ginocchio) NRHP-listed
Hardy House, 2400 Broadway, Little Rock, AR (Thompson and Harding) NRHP-listed
Hemingway House (Little Rock), 1720 Arch St., Little Rock, AR (Rickon & Thompson) NRHP-listed
Hemingway House and Barn (Fayetteville), 3310 Old Missouri Rd., Fayetteville, AR (Thompson, Charles L.) NRHP-listed
Ida Hicks House, 410 W. Arch St., Searcy, AR (Thompson, Charles L.) NRHP-listed
Healey and Roth Mortuary Building, 815 Main, Little Rock, AR (Sanders & Ginocchio), NRHP-listed
Hospital and Benevolent Association, 11th and Cherry, Pine Bluff, AR (Thompson, Charles L.), NRHP-listed on December 22, 1982 with reference number 82000841.  Removed from NRHP, January 25, 2010 (which happens usually after a building has been demolished).
Hot Spring County Courthouse, 210 Locust St., Malvern, AR (Thompson, Sanders,& Ginnochio) NRHP-listed
Hotze House, 1619 Louisiana St., Little Rock, AR (Thompson, Charles L.) NRHP-listed
Howson House, 1700 S. Olive St., Pine Bluff, AR (Thompson & Harding) NRHP-listed
Hudson House, 304 W. 5th St., Pine Bluff, AR (Thompson, Charles L.) NRHP-listed
Immaculate Heart of Mary Church, N of North Little Rock off AR 365, North Little Rock, AR (Thompson, Sanders & Ginocchio) NRHP-listed
Interstate Orphanage, (1928), 339 Combs, Hot Springs, AR (Thompson, Sanders, and Ginocchio) NRHP-listed
Johnson House (514 E. 8th St.), Little Rock, AR (Thompson, Charles L.) NRHP-listed
Johnson House (516 E. 8th St.), Little Rock, AR (Thompson, Charles L.) NRHP-listed
Johnson House (518 E. 8th St.), Little Rock, AR (Thompson, Charles L.) NRHP-listed
Johnson House (Pine Bluff), 315 Martin St., Pine Bluff, AR (Thompson, Charles L.) NRHP-listed
Katzenstein House, 902 W. 5th St., Pine Bluff, AR (Thompson, Charles L.) NRHP-listed
Keith House, 2200 Broadway, Little Rock, AR (Thompson, Charles L.) NRHP-listed, built 1912 in Prairie School, Bungalow/Craftsman style
Kittrell House, 1103 Hickory St., Texarkana, AR (Thompson, Charles L.) NRHP-listed
Lightle House, 605 Race Ave., Searcy, AR (Thompson, Charles L.) NRHP-listed
Little Rock Boys Club, 8th & Scott Sts., Little Rock, AR (Thompson, Sanders, and Ginocchio) NRHP-listed
Little Rock Central Fire Station, 520 W. Markham St., Little Rock, AR (Thompson, Charles) NRHP-listed
Little Rock City Hall, 500 W. Markham St., Little Rock, AR (Thompson, Charles) NRHP-listed
Lloyd England Hall, Jct. of Missouri Ave. and 6th St., NW corner, North Little Rock, AR (Thompson, Sanders, and Ginocchio) NRHP-listed
Lo Beele House, 312 New York Ave., Brinkley, AR (Thompson, Charles L.) NRHP-listed
Mann House, 422 Forest St., Forrest City, AR (Thompson, Charles L.) NRHP-listed
Marshall House, 2009 Arch St., Little Rock, AR (Thompson, Charles L.) NRHP-listed
Martin Hall, Hendrix College campus, Conway, AR (Thompson & Housing) NRHP-listed
McClintock House (43 Magnolia), Marianna, AR, NRHP-listed
McClintock House (82 W. Main St.), Marianna, AR, NRHP-listed
McKennon House, 115 Grandview, Clarksville, AR (Thompson, Charles L.) NRHP-listed
Henry Crawford McKinney House, 510 E. Faulkner, El Dorado, AR (Thompson, Charles L.) NRHP-listed
McLean House, 470 Ridgeway, Little Rock, AR (Thompson & Harding) NRHP-listed
McRae House, 1113 E. 3rd St., Hope, AR (Thompson and Harding) NRHP-listed
D. L. McRae House, 424 E. Main St., Prescott, AR (Thompson, Charles L.) NRHP-listed
T. C. McRae House, 506 E. Elm St., Prescott, AR (Thompson and Harding) NRHP-listed
Mehaffey House, 2101 Louisiana, Little Rock, AR (Thompson, Charles L.) NRHP-listed
Merchants & Farmers Bank, (1913), Waterman and Main Sts., Dumas, AR (Thompson, Charles L.) NRHP-listed
Merchants and Planters Bank, 214 Madison, Clarendon, AR (Thompson and Harding) NRHP-listed
Mitchell House (Batesville), 1138 Main St., Batesville, AR (Thompson and Harding) NRHP-listed
Mitchell House (Little Rock), 1415 Spring St., Little Rock, AR (Thompson, Charles L.) NRHP-listed
Monroe County Courthouse, Courthouse Sq., Clarendon, AR (Thompson, Charles L.) NRHP-listed
Moore Building, 519-523 Center St., Little Rock, AR (Thompson, Sanders & Ginocchio) NRHP-listed
Moore House, 20 Armistead, Little Rock, AR (Thompson, Sanders, & Ginocchio) NRHP-listed
Mount Holly Mausoleum, 12th and Broadway, Little Rock, AR (Thompson and Harding) NRHP-listed
Charles H. Murphy Sr. House, 900 N. Madison Ave., El Dorado, AR NRHP-listed
Nash House (409 E. 6th St.), Little Rock, AR (Thompson, Charles L.) NRHP-listed
Nash House (601 Rock St.), Little Rock, AR (Thompson, Charles L.) NRHP-listed
Newport Junior & Senior High School, Remmel Park, Newport, AR (Thompson, Sanders and Ginocchio) NRHP-listed
Nichol House, 205 Park Pl., Pine Bluff, AR (Thompson, Charles L.) NRHP-listed
North Little Rock Post Office, 420 N. Main St., North Little Rock, AR (Thompson, Sanders, & Ginocchio) NRHP-listed
Park Hotel, 210 Fountain, Hot Springs, AR (Thompson, Sanders & Ginocchio) NRHP-listed
Pfeifer Brothers Department Store, 522-524 S. Main St., Little Rock, AR (Thompson, Charles L.) NRHP-listed
President's House, Hendrix College campus, Conway, AR (Thompson, Charles L.) NRHP-listed
Puddephatt House, 1820 S. Olive St., Pine Bluff, AR (Thompson, Charles L.) NRHP-listed
Pugh House, (1905-1907), off US 165, Portland, AR (Thompson, Charles L.) NRHP-listed
Ragland House, 1617 Center St., Little Rock, AR (Thompson, Charles L.) NRHP-listed
E. S. Ready House, 929 Beech St., Helena, AR (Thompson, Charles L.) NRHP-listed
Reid House, 1425 Kavanaugh St., Little Rock, AR (Thompson, Charles L.) NRHP-listed
Remmel Apartments, four buildings each separately listed on the NRHP (Thompson & Harding; Charles L. Thompson), three in Bungalow/Craftsman and the one in Colonial Revival style:
Remmel Apartments (1704-1706 Spring St.), Little Rock, AR (Thompson & Harding) NRHP-listed
Remmel Apartments (1708-1710 Spring St.), Little Rock, AR (Thompson & Harding) NRHP-listed
Remmel Apartments (409-411 W. 17th St.), Little Rock, AR (Thompson & Harding) NRHP-listed
Remmel Flats, 1700-1702 Spring St., Little Rock, AR (Thompson, Charles L.) NRHP-listed
Retan House, 2510 Broadway, Little Rock, AR (Thompson, Charles L.) NRHP-listed
Riviera Hotel, 719 Central, Hot Springs, AR (Thompson, Sanders & Ginocchio) NRHP-listed
Rogers House, 400 W. 18th St., Little Rock, AR (Thompson, Charles L.) NRHP-listed
U. M. Rose School, Izard and W. 13th St., Little Rock, AR (Thompson, Charles L.) NRHP-listed
Roselawn Memorial Park Gatehouse, 2801 Asher, Little Rock, AR (Thompson & Harding) NRHP-listed
Russell House, 1617 S. Olive St., Pine Bluff, AR (Thompson, Charles L.) NRHP-listed
Safferstone House, 2205 Arch St. Little Rock, AR, (Sanders & Ginocchio), NRHP-listed
Saline County Courthouse, Courthouse Sq., Benton, AR (Thompson, Charles L.) NRHP-listed
Schaer House, 1862 Arch St., Little Rock, AR (Thompson & Harding) NRHP-listed
Fred and Lucy Alexander Schaer House, 13219 US70, Galloway, AR (Thompson, Charles) NRHP-listed
Shull House, 418 Park, Lonoke, AR (Thompson and Harding) NRHP-listed
Skillern House, 2522 Arch St., Little Rock, AR (Thompson, Charles L.) NRHP-listed
Smith House, Memphis Ave., Wheatley, AR (Thompson & Harding) NRHP-listed
S. G. Smith House, (1909), 1837 Caldwell St., Conway, AR (Thompson & Harding) NRHP-listed
St. Edwards Church, 823 Sherman, Little Rock, AR (Thompson, Charles L.) NRHP-listed
St. Andrew's Episcopal Church, 1070 South Church Street, Mountain Home, AR (Robert Hall Millett)
St. Luke's Episcopal Church, Spring and Cottage Sts., Hot Springs, AR (Thompson & Harding) NRHP-listed
St. Paul's Parish Church, 5th and Main, Batesville, AR (Thompson, Charles L.) NRHP-listed
Snyder House, 4004 S. Lookout, Little Rock, AR, (Sanders & Ginocchio), NRHP-listed
Stewart House, 1406 Summit St., Little Rock, AR, (Thompson, Charles L.) NRHP-listed
Strauss House, 528 E. Page St., Malvern, AR (Thompson and Harding) NRHP-listed
Thane House, (1909), Levy and First Sts., Arkansas City, AR (Thompson & Harding) NRHP-listed
Thurston House, 923 Cumberland St., Little Rock, AR (Thompson, Charles L.) NRHP-listed
Trimble House, 518 Center St., Lonoke, AR (Thompson, Charles L.) NRHP-listed
Turner House, 1701 Center St., Little Rock, AR (Thompson, Charles L.) NRHP-listed
Vanetten House, 1012 Cumberland, Little Rock, AR (Thompson, Charles L.) NRHP-listed
Vaughan House, 2201 Broadway, Little Rock, AR (Thompson, Charles L.) NRHP-listed
Vinson House, 2123 Broadway, Little Rock, AR (Thompson, Charles) NRHP-listed
Wade Building, 231 Central, Hot Springs, AR (Thompson, Sanders & Ginocchio) NRHP-listed
Walls House, 406 Jefferson St., Lonoke, AR (Thompson, Charles L.) NRHP-listed
Dr. James Wyatt Walton House, 301 W. Sevier, Benton, AR (Thompson, Charles L.) NRHP-listed
Washington County Courthouse, College Ave. and E. Center St., Fayetteville, AR (Thompson, Charles) NRHP-listed
Waters House, (1907), 515 Oak St., Fordyce, AR (Thompson, Charles L.) NRHP-listed
Tom Watkins House, Jct. of Oak and Race Sts., Searcy, AR (Thompson, Charles L.) NRHP-listed
Wheat House, 600 Center St., Lonoke, AR (Thompson, Charles L.) NRHP-listed
White House, 1015 Perry St., Helena, AR (Thompson, Charles) NRHP-listed
Hamp Williams Building, 500-504 Ouachita Ave., Hot Springs, AR (Sanders & Ginocchio), NRHP-listed
Winfield Methodist Church, 1601 Louisiana, Little Rock, AR (Thompson & Harding) NRHP-listed
Woodruff County Courthouse, 500 N. 3rd St., Augusta, AR (Thompson, Charles L.) NRHP-listed
One or more properties in Argenta Historic District's Boundary Increase II,  Roughly bounded by N. Poplar, 9th St., N. Broadway, W. 4th, Broadway, in North Little Rock, Arkansas NRHP-listed
One or more properties in Beech Street Historic District, Roughly bounded by McDonough, Columbia, Beech, Elm, Perry and College, Helena, Arkansas Thompson, Charles) NRHP-listed
One or more works in Camp Ouachita Girl Scout Camp Historic District, Area surrounding and N of Lake Sylvia, Ouachita NF, Paron, AR (Thompson, Sanders & Ginnochio) NRHP-listed
One or more works in Charlotte Street Historic District, roughly bounded by Holmes, Charlotte, Broadway, and E. College Sts., Fordyce, AR (Sanders & Ginocchio), NRHP-listed
One or more works in Clifton and Greening Streets Historic District, Roughly bounded by Clifton, and Greening Sts., and Dallas, and Cleveland Aves., Camden, AR (Thompson, Charles) NRHP-listed
One or more works in East Markham Street Historic District, 301-303,305-307,313 and 323 East Markham St., Little Rock, AR (Thompson, Charles L.) NRHP-listed
One or more works in Fordyce Commercial Historic District, Roughly bounded by Oak, 5th & Spring Sts. & AR 274, Fordyce, AR (Thompson, Charles) NRHP-listed
Multiple properties within Governor's Mansion Historic District, Roughly along Louisiana Ave., from W. 23rd St. and 24th St., Little Rock, AR (Thompson, Charles L.) NRHP-listed  Includes Remmel Apartments.
One or more works in Governor's Mansion Historic District, Roughly bounded by Louisiana St., Twenty-Third St. & Roosevelt Rd., Chester and State Sts., & Thirteenth & Twelfth Sts., Little Rock, AR (Thompson, Charles L.) NRHP-listed
One or more works in Harrison Courthouse Square Historic District, Roughly bounded by N. Walnut, W. Ridge, N. Willow, and W. Stephenson Sts., Harrison, AR (Thompson, Charles L.) NRHP-listed
One or more works in Hillcrest Historic District, Bounded by Woodrow, Jackson and Markham Sts. and N. Lookout Rd., Little Rock, AR (Thompson, Charles L.) NRHP-listed
One or more works in Hot Springs Central Avenue Historic District (boundary increase), 101 Park Ave. Hot Springs, AR, (Sanders & Ginocchio), NRHP-listed
One or more works in Pine Bluff Commercial Historic District, Roughly bounded by US 65B, Walnut St., 10th Ave. & S. Alabama St., Pine Bluff, AR (Thompson, Charles) NRHP-listed
One or more works in Robinson Historic District, Roughly bounded by Cross, Prince, Faulkner, and Watkins Sts., and Robinson Ave., Conway, AR (Thompson, Charles L.) NRHP-listed
One or more works in South Main Street Residential Historic District, South Main St. from 19th St. to 24th St., Little Rock, AR (Thompson, Charles L.) NRHP-listed

References

Architecture firms based in Arkansas